Wanklyn is a surname. Notable people with the surname include:

James Alfred Wanklyn, nineteenth-century English chemist
James Leslie Wanklyn, Liberal MP for Bradford Central
Malcolm David Wanklyn, recipient of the Victoria Cross